Kirill Gavrilychev (born February 21, 1989) is a Russian professional ice hockey defenceman. He is currently playing with Yermak Angarsk of the Supreme Hockey League (VHL).

Gavrilychev made his Kontinental Hockey League debut playing with Metallurg Novokuznetsk during the 2014–15 KHL season.

References

External links

1989 births
Living people
Metallurg Novokuznetsk players
Russian ice hockey defencemen
HC Spartak Moscow players
Sportspeople from Yaroslavl